Static fatigue describes material weakening that happens at a stress level less than would be required to cause an ordinary tensile fracture. 

While fatigue is generally the result of repeated application and relaxation of stresses, static fatigue occurs during prolonged and constant application of stress. Defects in the material and environmental factors are gradually amplified until the tensile strength of the material falls below the applied stress, or the stress pattern changes in such a way that certain areas have stress exceeding the tensile strength.

Static fatigue can occur through several means, including plastic flow or crack propagation. It is sometimes called “delayed fracture”, referring to the long period of time the crack takes to grow large enough to cause structural failure. Static fatigue is a form of material embrittlement, and occurs in various materials and diverse environments.

Typical occurrence 
As a common phenomenon, static fatigue can be manifested in many kinds of embrittlement. The mechanisms involved are closely related to the nucleation and growth of cracks. Two typical situations are listed here for reference.

Metal embrittlement 
Metal embrittlement (ME) happens when a low-melting-point metal is placed in contact with a higher melting point metal, making the latter embrittled. It is often manifested by static fatigue. For example, as shown in Figure 1, in a test of the static fatigue of a 2024 aluminum coated with mercury, the alloy is subject to a stress level less than the value causing plastic flow, and the time it takes to fracture is measured. Usually, a stress called static fatigue limit is present, representing the boundary below which the material does not fracture, no matter how long the test duration is. In this scenario, the static fatigue often depends on the presence of initial flaws. Also, if the material is "flawless", its static fatigue limit serves as a design parameter in a hostile environment.

Stress corrosion cracking 

Stress corrosion cracking (SCC) is the unexpected sudden failure of a stressed material exposed to an aqueous, corrosive fluid. Static fatigue is also found in this form of embrittlement, such as the moisture-enhanced static fatigue of glass, hydrogen embrittlement, embrittlement of some polymers in adverse environmental effects, etc. The static fatigue is also manifested similarly to the one described in ME. The static stress where a material failure can be prevented is reduced by adverse environmental effects. Furthermore, the static fatigue limit is observed.

Kinetics 
The strength versus temperature plot of glass exposed in the air is displayed in Figure 2. For different exposure times in the air, the static fatigue is temperature dependent, indicating that kinetic considerations can explain the phenomenon. Static fatigue is not obvious at low temperatures because of limited atomic mobility. In this case, below certain temperatures, embrittlement is not observed. At higher temperatures, the static fatigue is also not as pronounced due to increased crack-tip viscous deformation or lesser surface adsorption of the embrittling species.

References 

Continuum mechanics
Corrosion
Deformation (mechanics)
Fracture mechanics
Materials degradation